Monica Lacy (née Creel; born August 27, 1970) is an American television and film actress. Lacy is an identical triplet who, along with her sisters, Leanna and Joy, started acting in the late 1980s. They appeared together in two television movies aired on The Wonderful World of Disney: Parent Trap III and Parent Trap: Hawaiian Honeymoon.

Biography 
Monica Lacy grew up in Fullerton, California.

Lacy studied acting with Larry Moss and Howard Fine and took classes at The Groundlings.  She's performed stand-up about her unusual childhood behind the ‘Orange Curtain’ and has starred in nearly 200 television commercials; she currently serves as a TV commercial spokesperson for AutoNation.

The Creel sisters, Monica, Joy, and Leanna, appeared in roles together on Growing Pains and Beverly Hills 90210, among others; they also were interviewed on The Tonight Show starring Johnny Carson. While her sisters eventually chose paths away from the spotlight, Monica began appearing in several popular television shows, which included Married... with Children, where she appeared as Esther, a celibate teen-in-distress, whom Bud, who works as a dispatcher for a "Virgin Hotline", must talk into staying celibate in the season 9 episode "Dial "B" for Virgin". Lacy's additional television credits include dating Kramer on the classic Seinfeld episode "The Yada Yada", going through heartbreak on FOX's Party of Five, and an appearance on the Baywatch episode "Shark's Cove" in 1992.

Lacy's more recent television appearances include guest-starring roles on CBS's Hawaii Five-O as an MIT computer scientist and on ABC's Agents of S.H.I.E.L.D. as a suffering wife.

She has also appeared in such films as the Sundance Award-winning Possums, Freeway with Reese Witherspoon, and The Cell alongside Vincent D’Onofrio. She's starred in five hour-long pilots for CBS, MTV, and NBC, including Clyde Phillips' Time Well Spent and the series lead in the 1999 made-for-TV movie Sorority, alongside January Jones and Christina Hendricks.

Personal life
Lacy holds a B.A. in English Literature from UCLA and completed the university's Professional Screenwriting Program.

She and her two children reside in Los Angeles.

Filmography

Film

Television

References

External links
Monica Lacy Official Website

1970 births
American child actresses
American film actresses
American television actresses
Actresses from Los Angeles
Triplets
University of California, Los Angeles alumni
American women screenwriters
Living people
Screenwriters from California
21st-century American women